Theologos (also known as Tholos): is a village on the Greek island of Rhodes. It is located on the west coast of the island, about 19 km far from the capital. It is a part of the Municipality of Petaloudes. The old centre of Tholos is built in traditional Rhodian style. With tall shuttered buildings and narrow streets, the village is a delight to wander through. Also, the picturesque church of Agios Spiridonas, with its lovely white bell tower, is among the attractions. It has an attraction for holiday makers with many people coming from all over Europe. Not far from the airport, the town's easy accessibility makes it even more attractive for tourists and in 2004 celebrated tourists who had visited more than once with an award naming them as 'dedicated friends'.

References 

Populated places in Rhodes